Freddie Hutchinson was an Irish footballer who played with Drumcondra in the 1930s and made two appearances for the Republic of Ireland national team.

Hutchinson was capped twice for the Republic of Ireland at senior level winning both caps in May 1935 in away friendlies versus Switzerland and Germany.

References

External links
 Profile from soccerscene.ie

Republic of Ireland association footballers
Association football midfielders
Republic of Ireland international footballers
Drumcondra F.C. players
Year of birth missing